Limnaecia psalidota is a moth in the family Cosmopterigidae. It is found in Sri Lanka.

References

External links
Natural History Museum Lepidoptera generic names catalog

Limnaecia
Moths described in 1917
Moths of Sri Lanka
Taxa named by Edward Meyrick